Gynophorea is a monotypic genus of flowering plants belonging to the family Brassicaceae. It only contains the one species, Gynophorea weileri Gilli

It is native to Afghanistan.

References

Brassicaceae
Brassicaceae genera
Flora of Afghanistan